Ethel Josephine Alpenfels (1907–1981) was an American anthropologist who served as professor of anthropology at New York University.

Born to a German baron, Alpenfels graduated from the University of Washington and received her Ph.D. from the University of Chicago. In her studies as part of the Bureau for Intercultural Education in 1944, she went to high schools in Chicago and educated students on differences and cultures, explaining that people considered "simple" have complex cultures.

In 1946 she authored a short book entitled Sense and Nonsense About Race for young people attempting to dispell myths about racial differences and racial superiority. This book remained in print through 1967.

References

1907 births
1981 deaths
American women anthropologists
20th-century American women scientists
20th-century American scientists
20th-century American anthropologists
German emigrants to the United States